is a sequel series to the Yu-Gi-Oh! anime television series Yu-Gi-Oh! Zexal, produced by Nihon Ad Systems and TV Tokyo. Like the original, this series is directed by Satoshi Kuwahara and produced by Studio Gallop. The anime aired in Japan on TV Tokyo between October 7, 2012 to March 23, 2014, in a different time slot from that of the original series, while the English-language adaptation by Konami began airing in the United States on The CW's Vortexx programming block from August 17, 2013.  Due to Vortexx's re-airing of Zexal II episodes, new episodes have been moved to Hulu since July 14, 2014, beginning with Episode 114. Since then, most of the episodes have aired on Mondays on Hulu. On December 14, the episodes on Hulu began to be uploaded on Sundays instead of Mondays, with the exception of December 6, which saw Episode 135 being uploaded on a Saturday, because the following Sunday was National Pearl Harbor Remembrance Day. The regular airing pattern was broken again when the series finale (Episode 146) aired on February 21, a Saturday, instead of on a Sunday. Following the end of the first series, Yuma and his friends now find themselves up against the evil forces of Barian World.

Six pieces of theme music are used for the series: three opening and three ending themes. However, for Episode 146, the Season 3 Japanese opening theme was not used. For the Konami English dub version, the opening theme is "Halfway to Forever" for all episodes that air in the US.


Episode list

References

Zexal II (season 2)
2013 Japanese television seasons